A basketball card is a type of trading card relating to basketball, usually printed on cardboard, silk, or plastic. These cards feature one or more players of the National Basketball Association, National Collegiate Athletic Association, Olympic basketball, Women's National Basketball Association, Women's Professional Basketball League, or some other basketball related theme.

Some notable producing companies include Panini Group (present days), Bowman Gum and Topps (in early days).

History 
The first basketball cards were produced in 1910, in a series cataloged as "College Athlete Felts B-33". The complete series included ten different sports, with only 30-cards being associated with basketball. The cards were issued as a cigarette redemption premium by The number of packages needed to redeem for the tobacco cards is not known.

The next series of basketball cards were issued in 1911, in two separate series, "T6 College Series", measuring approximately 6" by 8", and "T51 College Series", measuring approximately 2" by 3". These series included a variety of sports, with only 6-cards being associated with basketball. One card from the T6 series, and five cards from the T51 series. Both series were produced in two variations; one variation reading "College Series", the other, "2nd Series". The cards were acquired in trade for fifteen Murad cigarette coupons. The offer expired June 30, 1911.

Basketball cards were not seen again until 1932, when C.A. Briggs Chocolate issued a 31-card set containing multiple sports. In exchange for a completed set of cards, Briggs offered baseball equipment. The number of basketball cards in the set is not known.

Bowman Gum produced the first NBA cards, starting in 1948, releasing a 72-piece set that included the George Mikan rookie card. Another US company, Topps, began to manufacture cards during the 1958, returning to production in 1969–70. Fleer had its peak in 1961-62, returning in 1986–87, to resurrect the basketball card industry by releasing its set which included the rookie cards of Michael Jordan and Charles Barkley. This set is seen by many basketball card collectors as the "1952 Topps of basketball." In the 1990s/2000s, several companies produced basketball cards, including Topps, Fleer, and Upper Deck.

In 2009, the NBA licensed the rights to manufacture and commercialize basketball cards to Italian Panini Group, which became the only licensor for the league and players. Panini has been NBA licensee since then.

References

External links

 Basketball cards on Panini America 

Trading cards
Sports memorabilia
Card